Pál Pétervári is a Hungarian sprint canoer who competed in the late 1980s and early 1990s. He won two medals in the C-2 10000 m event with a gold in 1991 and a silver in 1987. Bendegúz Pétervári-Molnár is his nephew and Zoltán Molnár is  his brother-in-law; both are Olympic rowers.

References

Hungarian male canoeists
Living people
Year of birth missing (living people)
ICF Canoe Sprint World Championships medalists in Canadian
20th-century Hungarian people